Hassel Smith (born Hassell Wendell Smith Jr.; April 24, 1915 – January 2, 2007) was an American painter.

Biography 

Hassel Smith was born in 1915 in Sturgis, Michigan. During childhood and adolescence his family alternated between homes in Michigan and the West Coast, due to the health of his mother. He became an Eagle Scout at 15 and was an active outdoorsman for much of his adult life.

Smith attended Northwestern University (Chicago) 1932-36. Initially a chemistry major, he graduated BSc cum laude with majors in History of Art and English Literature.

In the Chicago of the early thirties, Smith witnessed Ballet Russe de Monte Carlo under Massine and was exposed to painting at the Worlds Fair: turning points in his development.  He won a scholarship to Princeton for graduate studies in History of Art, but chose to spend two years at California School of Fine Art (now San Francisco Art Institute) in the painting and drawing class of his mentor, Maurice Sterne. "I have no hesitation in saying that to whatever extent my intellect has been engaged in the joys and mysteries of transferring visual observations in three dimensions into meaningful two-dimensional marks and shapes, I owe to Sterne."

Smith worked with derelict and alcoholic individuals on skid row in San Francisco during the late thirties, becoming active in leftwing politics. He received a Rosenberg Traveling Fellowship in 1941 for independent study, moving to the Motherlode region of northern California. His work until the end of 1942 was made plein-air with a focus on town and landscape.

During the war years Smith was engaged in alternative service as a timber scaler in Oregon and as a camp supervisor in the Central Valley, near Arvin, southern California. He met June Myers, a social worker for the migrant labour program, there and they married in September 1942 (their son Joseph was born in 1947). From 1945 to 1951 Smith was a celebrated teacher at CSFA working under Douglas MacAgy and Clyfford Still, alongside Ed Corbett, David Park, Elmer Bischoff, Richard Diebenkorn and Frank Lobdell, among many other significant artists, filmmakers and designers. He was influenced deeply by Still's 1947 exhibition at the Palace of the Legion of Honor, forming a friendship with the artist that lasted until Still's death in 1980.

From 1953 until late 1965 Smith lived in an apple orchard outside Sebastopol, Sonoma County, painting in a self-built redwood-sided studio. His work from these years, referred to by critic Allan Temko as the "Thunderbolt period", had significant impact on artists along the entire West Coast. Smith was one of the few artists, along with Sonia Gechtoff, Jay DeFeo and Bruce Conner, then based in northern California, to be exhibited in Los Angeles by Irving Blum and Walter Hopps at the Ferus Gallery during the late fifties and early sixties. His shows at Ferus ensured Smith's singular influence on southern California painters. His paintings were shown also in San Francisco, New York, London and Milan, and were acquired widely in both private and public collections.

June Myers Smith died of cancer at the age of 40 in August 1958. Smith subsequently married Donna Raffety Harrington in 1959 (their son Bruce was born in 1960 - adding to Donna's sons Mark and Stephan, and Hassel and June's son Joseph). In 1962-63 Smith moved for one year with his family to Mousehole in Cornwall, England, occupying a studio on the quays at Newlyn.

During 1963-65 Smith taught part-time at UC Berkeley. In 1965 he moved his family to Los Angeles, teaching at UCLA. He had contact with several southern California artists, most notably the painter John Altoon (a close friend since the fifties).

Smith moved permanently to England in 1966 accepting a tenured teaching position at the Royal West of England Academy of Art (later Bristol Polytechnic, Faculty of Fine Art).

Having returned to representational painting in 1964, Smith began the series of hard-edged "measured paintings" in 1970, which continued into the late eighties. He returned as guest professor to the West Coast periodically during the seventies, at UC Davis and SFAI. Major retrospectives followed at San Francisco Museum of Modern Art in 1975, and at Oakland Museum in 1981.

Smith retired from teaching in 1980 and moved to an eighteenth-century rectory at Rode, north Somerset. The following seventeen years were a prolific period with output in painting, drawing and printmaking. The final decade of work saw two significant stylistic shifts characterized by aspects of gestural abstraction. Illness forced suspension of work in late 1997. Hassel Smith died nine years later.

His son Bruce is a prolific musician, playing with John Lydon of The Sex Pistols and On U Sound and many other bands who made a mark on the British post punk scene.

Artworks 

The principal phases of Hassel Smith's work form a sequence of six progressions, with a pattern of overlapping elements as each phase anticipates the succeeding:
Plein air and representational paintings of the 1940s
Abstract-expressionism of the 1950s to mid-1960s
American Figurative Expressionism, Bay Area Figurative Movement, and representation 1964-70
Hard-edge abstraction, the "measured paintings", 1970 to the late 1980s
Gestural abstraction, late 1980s to mid-1990s
Late abstraction, mid to late 1990s.

Smith's paintings and drawings prior to World War II are principally plein-air studies of town and landscape locations, executed on-site from direct observation.

During the war period, while working as a camp supervisor in the Central Valley, he made numerous drawings of field workers: "It seems to me that the drawings that I began to make of field workers and so on, are among the first things which I consider to have really quite significant quality".

His paintings of the post-war years (1945–48) continued in representational vein reflecting Bay Area street-life and bar scenes, characterised by flattened space with frequent combination of collage elements taken from advertising and newsprint, and increasingly tough gestural brushwork. Smith's humor and social conscience are evident in the works from this period.

Smith's most influential and widely known paintings and drawings developed rapidly from the end of the 1940s, lasting into the mid-1960s. The influence of Clyfford Still's torn fields of color was apparent from an early stage, alternatively a strident dispersion of roughly applied post-pointillist strokes. By the mid-1950s Smith achieved an entirely independent stylistic language, integrating raw canvas and broad patches of color with a combination of short curving, also ruled linear markings that dance at speed across the visual plane, tightening pictorial space.

From 1964 to 1970 Smith returned to representational painting with a series of large-scale figure compositions and street scenes; partly invented, partly observed, occasionally deriving ironically from renaissance and classical themes (Tarquin and Lucretia, Cupid and Venus, et al.: Smith's most favored artists from the past were Titian and Georges de la Tour). It is clear from the paintings of this period, as from the paintings of the 1940s, that Smith's concepts of representational painting were not responsive to the academic atelier tradition. Both amusing and elegant, Smith's paintings of the late 1960s form a pivotal transition from abstract-expressionism to a cool hard-edged aesthetic.

The presence of an underlying but only partially visible grid, a modular schemata, identified the paintings of the 1970s to late 1980s as the "measured paintings". Made on recurring square and rectangular formats having the same vertical dimension, the measured paintings consist of high-density synthetic acrylic paints fabricated from separate components. There is evident use of compass and straight-edge without taped lines, yet vigorous brushwork within the boundaries of drawn elements. By the mid-1970s the supporting grid was undetectable beneath an interplay of squares, rectangles, triangles, circles of varying dimensions embraced within tonal fields.

The emergence of apparently random brushstrokes and markings, tenuously confined by the compositional schema of late-series measured paintings, led to complete disintegration of the grid strategy as the visual plane surrendered to an opulent gestural abstraction (1987 to 1994). Vortices of clustered multi-tonal strokes grow and diminish, explosive and wave-like, within fields of thinly tinted canvas. Made from high-density acrylic components, paintings of this period suggest simultaneously the density of oil with the translucency of aquarelle. A counterpoise of planar solidity and spatial infinitude contributes to vitality and allure.

Regrettably few paintings comprise the final group of Smith's works, executed in the three years before a Parkinsonian illness prevented further output. Rarely exhibited and little-known, they are an amassing of gestural marks into solid shapes whose tonal contrasts and soft edges create interlocking dramas of pictorial space. Hassel Smith's last works are consistent with his signature West coast sensibility, yet there is a compelling tenderness and fragility.

A large group of drawings, graphite and ink on paper, date from 1996 to 1997.

Awards 

 1967 National Endowment for the Arts - "distinguished service to American art"
 1981 Art Commission of the City and County of San Francisco - "outstanding achievement in painting"
 1988 Cunningham Endowed Chair, College of Notre Dame (California)
 1991 Honorary Doctorate, San Francisco Art Institute

Collections (selection) 

 Albright-Knox Art Gallery, Buffalo, New York
 Atlantic Richfield Company, Los Angeles
 Berkeley Art Museum and Pacific Film Archive, California
 Crocker Art Museum, Sacramento 
 Dallas Museum of Art
 Federal Reserve Bank of San Francisco
 Hirshhorn Museum and Sculpture Garden, Smithsonian Institution, Washington, D.C.
 Houston Museum of Art
 Los Angeles County Museum of Art
 Menil Collection, Houston 
 New Mexico Museum of Art, Santa Fe
 Norton Simon Museum, Pasadena, California
 Oakland Museum of California
 Palm Springs Desert Museum, California
 Phoenix Museum of Art
 Portland Art Museum, Oregon
 Saint Louis Art Museum
 San Francisco Museum of Modern Art
 San Francisco International Airport
 San Jose Museum of Art, California
 Santa Barbara Museum of Art, California
 Institute of Contemporary Art, California
 Smithsonian American Art Museum, Washington, D.C.
 Snite Museum of Art, Logan, Utah
 Sonoma County Art Museum, Santa Rosa, California
 Iris & B. Gerald Cantor Arts Center for Visual Arts at Stanford University, California
 Tate, London
 University of New Mexico, Albuquerque
 Washington University in St. Louis
 Whitney Museum, New York

Exhibitions 

Hassel Smith exhibited extensively on both coasts of the US, and in western Europe, from the late 1930s onwards. His first noted solo exhibition was curated by Jermayne McAgy at the Palace of the Legion of Honor, San Francisco, in 1947.

Group exhibitions with Elmer Bischoff, David Park, Richard Diebenkorn and Ed Corbett followed swiftly, during the late 1940s and early 1950s. Smith was included in the significant 1955 exhibition, ‘Action Painting’, at the Merry-Go-Round Building in Santa Monica, curated by Walter Hopps. Five years later, Smith’s first retrospective was curated by Walter Hopps at Pasadena Art Museum (1961).

Smith joined the LA-based Ferus Gallery in 1958 and received four solo exhibitions over a five-year period. His work was featured in the Ferus retrospective at Gagosian (NYC) in 2002. From the late 1950s through its closing in 1969 Smith had regular exhibitions at the Dilexi Gallery in San Francisco, owned and directed by Jim Newman. From the mid-1950s to the mid-1960s Smith exhibited at The New Arts in Houston, and at galleries in New York, London and Milan. In 1964 Smith was invited to participate in the Whitney Biannual and received a second retrospective at San Francisco State University. Major retrospectives followed at San Francisco Museum of Modern Art (1975) and Oakland Museum (1981). Smith’s work was included in the pivotal 1996 exhibition, ‘The San Francisco School of Abstract-Expressionism’, curated by Susan Landauer, at SFMOMA.

Statements 

Some of these paintings either tend to be or are about games, rules of the game and the strategies required to win without cheating. ALL of the paintings are about building, being in or getting out of cages, whether gilded or not. About being in and getting out of a cage while leaving the cage intact - Houdini stuff! The images include painting oneself into the middle of a room, papering over doors and windows, sitting on a limb while sawing it off next to the trunk. (January 1977)

In auditory terms SILENCE is discernible only in relation to NOISE, the reverse being equally true. The two states are functions of one another. The corners of a canvas are events with a necessary dimensional "interval" between them but that does not imply that the interval is without "eventfulness," is in other words, "nothing." (1980)

[...] as far as I am concerned I'm bringing the painting into much closer relation with music, the dance with verse, and the various discursive art forms in which rhythmic sequences play a role. (1988)

Sources 

 Petra Giloy-Hirtz (ed.), Hassel Smith. Paintings 1937-1997, Munich/London/New York: Prestel Publishing, 2012.
 Exhibition catalogue Hassel Smith, San Francisco: Weinstein Gallery, 2012. 
 Kirk Varnedoe (et al.), Ferus, New York: Rizzoli, 2002.
 Susan Landauer, The San Francisco School of Abstract Expressionism, Berkeley/ Los Angeles: University of California Press, 1996.
 Laura Whitcomb, DILEXI: a Gallery & Beyond, Los Angeles: Label Curatorial, 2021.

References

External links 

aaa.si.edu

American abstract artists
Abstract painters
Abstract expressionist artists
American Expressionist painters
American Figurative Expressionism
1915 births
2007 deaths
Modern painters
Painters from California
San Francisco Art Institute alumni
Northwestern University alumni
20th-century American painters
American male painters
People from Sturgis, Michigan
20th-century American male artists